"The Carpet Crawlers" is a song by the English progressive rock band Genesis, recorded for their sixth studio album The Lamb Lies Down on Broadway. Mike Rutherford and Tony Banks wrote most of the music, with the help of Peter Gabriel. Lyrically, the song tells the section of the album's story whereby Rael, the lead character, finds himself in a red carpeted corridor surrounded by kneeling people slowly crawling towards a wooden door. Rael dashes by them towards the door and goes through it. Behind the door is a table with a candlelit feast on it, and behind that, a spiral staircase that leads upwards out of sight.

The complex symbolism of Peter Gabriel's lyrics has been interpreted as referring to the fertilisation journey or as describing a scene inspired by Gnosticism in which humanity is misled by the 'callers': instead of the promise of heaven, the carpet crawlers find death and rebirth to a hellish environment.

The song was released in April 1975 as the album's second single under the title "The Carpet Crawlers". In 1995, Genesis re-recorded the song with producer Trevor Horn that featured Gabriel and Collins sharing lead vocals, released as "The Carpet Crawlers 1999". This marked the last time both singers recorded with Genesis, as Gabriel had left the band in 1975 and Collins quit in 1996 (though he would later rejoin the band in 2007).

Musical style
The song has been described as progressive rock by Pop Matters, and  soul by Far Out magazine, with them calling it a genre that tied together this song and subsequent Peter Gabriel solo songs such as Sledgehammer.

Releases
"The Carpet Crawlers" reappears on the 1976 Genesis: In Concert film with Bill Bruford on drums, and on Seconds Out, Genesis' 1977 live album, with Chester Thompson on drums. It was also played on subsequent tours in 1980, 1981/82, 1983/84, 1998, 2007, 2021/22 and the Six of the Best reunion concert with Peter Gabriel in 1982. It was also performed once during the 1992 tour.

A re-recorded version, called "The Carpet Crawlers 1999", was released on the compilation album Turn It On Again: The Hits; this is the last recording to date by the 5-man line-up of Peter Gabriel, Steve Hackett, Tony Banks, Phil Collins and Mike Rutherford, and is also the last studio recording by any configuration of Genesis to date. Gabriel and Collins share the role of lead vocals, ultimately harmonizing toward the end of the song. Collins contributes percussion programming as well, under a more contemporary drum and bass influence. The song's final verse was planned on being sung by Genesis' third singer Ray Wilson, but he left the band so the plan was dropped and the final verse was left out.

The B-sides of the 1999 single were "Turn It On Again" and "Follow You Follow Me". The song is also included as the final track of the 2007 live album Live Over Europe 2007 and on the live DVD When in Rome 2007.

Performance variations
On the 1974 studio version, Peter Gabriel sang an introductory verse beginning with "There is lambs' wool under my naked feet...", while from 1976 onwards Phil Collins omitted the introduction, and started the song with "The crawlers cover the floor...".   This later live version omitting the introductory verse is simply referred to as "The Carpet Crawl", as it is listed on Seconds Out.  The song as sung by Collins was a fixture through the 1981/82 tour, and was played as the final encore for each date of the 2007 Turn It On Again Tour (except The Hollywood Bowl because of rain) and the 2021/22 The Last Domino? Tour.

Personnel
Tony Banks – ARP Pro-Soloist & RMI Electra piano (1974); keyboards and additional programming (1999)
Phil Collins – drums, percussion, backing vocals (1974); co-lead vocals and programmed drums (1999)
Peter Gabriel – lead vocals and flute (1974); co-lead vocals and additional programming (1999)
Steve Hackett – electric guitar
Mike Rutherford – 12-string guitar, electric guitar, bass guitar, bass pedals, backing vocals

Cover versions
 Under the title "Carpet Crawl", it was covered by the German band M. Walking on Water for their 1993 EP, Pictures of an Exhibitionist.
 As "The Carpet Crawler" it was covered by Human Drama on their 1993 Pin Ups release.
 A version was recorded by John Ford (ex-Strawbs) for the 2006 album Golden Sound: Tribute to Genesis.
 Another version was covered by the jazz band Fragile on their 2007 cover album smile.
 Nick D'Virgilio (who played drums on Genesis' 1997 album Calling All Stations) and Mark Hornsby covered the song as part of their Rewiring Genesis: A Tribute To The Lamb Lies Down On Broadway Project in 2008.
 A cover was arranged and recorded by the German symphonic rock/chant band Gregorian for their 2009 album Masters of Chant: Chapter VII.
 The song was recorded for Steve Hackett's 2012 album Genesis Revisited II: Selection, with vocals by former Genesis singer Ray Wilson.
 It was covered by Mark Kozelek on his 2013 covers album Like Rats.

References

Genesis (band) songs
1974 songs
1975 singles
1999 singles
Songs written by Phil Collins
Songs written by Tony Banks (musician)
Songs written by Peter Gabriel
Songs written by Steve Hackett
Songs written by Mike Rutherford

ka:The Carpet Crawlers#The Carpet Crawlers 1999